Aseel Karim Hameem (born 6 October 1984) is an Iraqi singer. She started her professional career at the age of twenty two and has released various songs in collaboration with other artists. Hameem has also voiced the theme songs for multiple Arabic TV series. As of August 2020, her song "Ser Alhayah" is the most streamed song on YouTube by a female Arab artist with more than 255 million views.

Life and career 

Her father, Karim Hameem, is also a musician. She was a contestant in the Arab Stars program on MBC 1 with the Arab Mashreq team. She released her first solo song entitled "Balani Zemani" shortly afterwards. She has since released songs with different Arabic dialects.

Discography 

 Balani Zemani
 Atali3 Bel3eon
 Mn Mata
 Akher Zahour
 Qahar
 Ya Hala
 Betewhashny
 Asfer
 Al Soura
 Rouhi (2015)
 Ehsas Hobk (2016)
 Melyon Khater (2017)
 Wesh Mesawe
 Mahou Haki (2018)
 Khalk Bahr (2018)
 Of Menh Galbi (2018)
 Gad El Ata (2018)
 Al Kalam (2018)
 3ala Bali (2019)
 Almafroth (2019)
 Hawa Baghdad (2019)
 Ser Alhayah (2019)
 Enta Al Saadah (2020)
 Enta Kolshay (2020)
 Zorouf (2020)
 Yeshbahak Galbi (2020)
 Ehfaz Shakli (2021)
 Loqyak (2021)
 Shkad Helw (2021)
 Eii Enta (2022)

TV series sountrack 
 2008:  Shara Alnufus
 2011:  Banat Sokar Banat
 2012:  Akoon Aw La
 2013:  Tawali Al-Lail
 2019:  Hawa Baghdad
 2019:  Ahly W Nasy
 2019:  Kan Khaled
 2021:  Tigris and Euphrates
 2022:  Almas Maksoor
 2022:  Raheeq

References 

1984 births
Living people
21st-century Iraqi women singers